Cassida obtusata, is a species of leaf beetle widespread in Oriental region from Sri Lanka to China towards Sumatra and the Philippines.

Distribution
It if found in Cambodia, Sri Lanka, China, Japan, India, Indonesia, Laos, Malaysia, Myanmar, Nepal, the Philippines, Taiwan, Thailand, and Vietnam.

Biology
Adults have been observed from several plants such as, Amaranthus, Citrus and Passiflora edulis.

References 

Cassidinae
Insects of Sri Lanka
Beetles described in 1854